The Experiment of Professor Mithrany is a 1921 German silent film directed by Dimitri Buchowetzki and starring Max Landa, Hanni Weisse and Margit Barnay. It premiered at the Marmorhaus in Berlin.

The film's sets were designed by the art director Mathieu Oostermann.

Cast
 Max Landa
 Hanni Weisse
 Margit Barnay
 Robert Scholz

References

Bibliography
 Alfred Krautz. International directory of cinematographers, set- and costume designers in film, Volume 4. Saur, 1984.

External links

1921 films
Films of the Weimar Republic
German silent feature films
Films directed by Dimitri Buchowetzki
German black-and-white films
1920s German films